In mathematics, a topological algebra  is an algebra and at the same time a topological space, where the algebraic and the topological structures are coherent in a specified sense.

Definition
A topological algebra  over a topological field  is a topological vector space together with a bilinear multiplication

, 

Usually the continuity of the multiplication is expressed by one of the following (non-equivalent) requirements:

 joint continuity: for each neighbourhood of zero  there are neighbourhoods of zero  and  such that  (in other words, this condition means that the multiplication is continuous as a map between topological spaces  or

(Certainly, joint continuity implies stereotype continuity, and stereotype continuity implies separate continuity.) In the first case  is called a "topological algebra with jointly continuous multiplication", and in the last, "with separately continuous multiplication".

A unital associative topological algebra is (sometimes) called a topological ring.

History
The term was coined by David van Dantzig; it appears in the title of his doctoral dissertation (1931).

Examples 
1. Fréchet algebras are examples of associative topological algebras with jointly continuous multiplication.
2. Banach algebras are special cases of Fréchet algebras.
3. Stereotype algebras are examples of associative topological algebras with stereotype continuous multiplication.

Notes

External links

References
 

 
 
 

 
Topological vector spaces
Algebras